Sukenobe Dam is a gravity dam located in Toyama prefecture in Japan. The dam is used for power production. The catchment area of the dam is 6.8 km2. The dam impounds about 60  ha of land when full and can store 8790 thousand cubic meters of water. The construction of the dam was started on 1928 and completed in 1931.

References

Dams in Toyama Prefecture
1931 establishments in Japan